Ben Hook (born 5 March 1973) is an Australian cricketer. He played in one first-class match for South Australia in 1997/98. He later became the coach of Glenelg District Cricket Club.

See also
 List of South Australian representative cricketers

References

External links
 

1973 births
Living people
Australian cricketers
South Australia cricketers
Cricketers from Adelaide